Comamonas odontotermitis is a Gram-negative, aerobic, weak oxidase- and catalase-positive, non-spore-forming, rod-shaped, motile bacterium from the genus of Comamonas, which was isolated from the gut of the termite Coptotermes formosanus.

References

External links
Type strain of Comamonas odontotermitis at BacDive -  the Bacterial Diversity Metadatabase

Comamonadaceae
Bacteria described in 2007